Cinnamosma macrocarpa is a species of flowering plant in the family Canellaceae. It is endemic to Madagascar.

Description
Cinnamosma macrocarpa is a shrub or small tree, growing 3 to 18 meters tall.

Range and habitat
Cinnamosma macrocarpa is native to eastern and northwestern Madagascar, in the provinces of Antsiranana, Fianarantsoa, Toamasina and Toliara.

it grows in humid and subhumid littoral forests and on rocky soil in lowland and montane forests from sea level to 1,180 meters elevation.

There are ten known subpopulations of the species. It is affected by habitat loss from logging, conversion of land to agriculture, and mining. Its population is declining, and its conservation status is assessed as vulnerable.

References 

Canellaceae
Endemic flora of Madagascar
Flora of the Madagascar lowland forests
Flora of the Madagascar subhumid forests
Taxa named by Joseph Marie Henry Alfred Perrier de la Bâthie